Sa Nang Manora is a forest park in southern Thailand. It covers an area of 0.29 km2 (180 rai) of the Khao Thoi-Nang Hong Forest, Nop Pring Sub-district, Mueang District, Phang Nga Province, about four km north of Phang Nga town. It was established on 15 September 1980.

The park is on mostly plain terrain with few hills, with the Sa Nang Manora waterfall at the hill Khao Thoi. The main trees of the evergreen forest are Sonneratia sp., Eugenia sp., Shorea laevis, Euphorbiaceae sp., Saraca pierreana and Fagaceae sp.

External links
 National Park, Wildlife and Plant Conservation Department

Forest parks of Thailand
Protected areas established in 1980
Geography of Phang Nga province
Tenasserim Hills
Tourist attractions in Phang Nga province
1980 establishments in Thailand